St. Joseph High School is a private, Roman Catholic high school in Frederiksted, U.S. Virgin Islands on St. Croix.  The head of school is Mrs. Skalkos. It is located within the Roman Catholic Diocese of St. Thomas and is the only Catholic high school on St. Croix.

Background
St. Joseph High School was established in 1961.

External links
 School Website

References

High schools in the United States Virgin Islands
Catholic secondary schools in the United States Virgin Islands
Educational institutions established in 1961
1961 establishments in the United States Virgin Islands